Speaker of the Madhya Pradesh Legislative Assembly is the presiding officer of the Legislative Assembly of Madhya Pradesh, the main law-making body for the Indian state of Madhya Pradesh. He is elected by the members of the Madhya Pradesh Legislative Assembly. The speaker is always a member of the Legislative Assembly.

List of Speakers

References

Madhya Pradesh Legislative Assembly
 
Speakers of the Legislative Assembly